The 1921–22 Illinois Fighting Illini men's basketball team represented the University of Illinois.

Regular season
The 1921–22 season was the second and final one for head coach Frank Winters at the University of Illinois.  For Winters and the Illinois Fighting Illini men's basketball team, the season was highlighted by the play of All-American Chuck Carney.  Carney was selected as an All-American and named the Helms Foundation College Basketball Player of the Year at the completion of the season. The Illini's only losses were at the hands of Big Ten Conference opponents, ultimately placing them in a tie for fourth place. The overall record for this team was 14 wins and 5 losses. The Big Ten record for the season was 7 wins 5 losses. The starting lineup included Carney, R.H. Popken and G.E. Potter at forward, W.H. Roettger at center, and Laurie Walquist and John Sabo as guards.

Roster

Source

Schedule
												
Source																

|-	
!colspan=12 style="background:#DF4E38; color:white;"| Non-Conference regular season
|- align="center" bgcolor=""

			

|-	
!colspan=9 style="background:#DF4E38; color:#FFFFFF;"|Big Ten regular season

Bold Italic connotes conference game

Player stats

Awards and honors
Chuck Carney was elected to the "Illini Men's Basketball All-Century Team" in 2004. Carney was also selected as the Helms Foundation College Basketball Player of the Year for his play during the 1921–22 season.
Otto Vogel received the Big Ten Medal of Honor for his proficiency in athletics and scholastic work following the 1922 season.

References

Illinois Fighting Illini
Illinois Fighting Illini men's basketball seasons
Illinois Fighting Illini men's b
Illinois Fighting Illini men's b